Luigi Rava (29 November 1860 – 12 May 1938) was an Italian politician. He was born in Ravenna. He served on the faculty of the University of Bologna. He was mayor of Rome (1920–1921). He served in the Chamber of Deputies and Senate of the Kingdom of Italy. He was a recipient of the Order of Saints Maurice and Lazarus. He died in Rome on 12 May 1938.

References

External links

1860 births
1938 deaths
Finance ministers of Italy
Academic staff of the University of Bologna
Mayors of Rome
Recipients of the Order of Saints Maurice and Lazarus
Grand Officiers of the Légion d'honneur
Deputies of Legislature XVII of the Kingdom of Italy
Deputies of Legislature XVIII of the Kingdom of Italy
Deputies of Legislature XIX of the Kingdom of Italy
Deputies of Legislature XXI of the Kingdom of Italy
Deputies of Legislature XXII of the Kingdom of Italy
Deputies of Legislature XXIII of the Kingdom of Italy
Deputies of Legislature XXIV of the Kingdom of Italy
Grand Officers of the Order of the White Lion